Ptolemy XIV Philopator (c. 59 – 44 BC) was a Pharaoh of the Ptolemaic Kingdom of Egypt, who reigned from 47 until his death in 44 BC.

Biography
Following the death of his older brother Ptolemy XIII of Egypt on January 13, 47 BC, and according to his will, he was proclaimed Pharaoh and co-ruler by their older sister and remaining Pharaoh, Cleopatra VII of Egypt. He was about 12 years old when he acceded to the throne. He and his older sister, Cleopatra, were married, but Cleopatra continued to act as lover of Roman dictator Julius Caesar. Ptolemy is considered to have reigned in name only, as a concession to Egyptian tradition, with Cleopatra keeping actual authority.

On 15 March 44 BC Caesar was murdered in Rome by a group of conspirators whose most notable members were Brutus and Cassius. Ptolemy soon followed him in death. An inscription mentioning him as alive was dated at 26 July 44 BC. It has been  assumed but remains uncertain that Cleopatra poisoned her co-ruler, with aconite, to replace him with his nephew Ptolemy XV Caesar, her son by Caesar who was proclaimed co-ruler on 2 September 44 BC and whom his mother intended to support as successor of his father.

Ancestry

References

External links
 Ptolemy XIV Theos Philopator II entry in historical sourcebook by Mahlon H. Smith

1st-century BC births
44 BC deaths
1st-century BC Egyptian people
1st-century BC Pharaohs
1st-century BC rulers in Africa
Ancient child monarchs
Husbands of Cleopatra
Pharaohs of the Ptolemaic dynasty